was a philosopher, educator, and statesman in Shōwa period Japan. As Minister of Education in the immediate post-war era, he oversaw major reforms to the Japanese educational system.

Biography
Abe was born in Matsuyama, Ehime Prefecture as the son of a doctor of Chinese medicine. He graduated from Tokyo Imperial University, and was a close associate of Natsume Sōseki, Seiichi Hatano, Kyoshi Takahama and Shigeo Iwanami, although he was forced to return home to teach English in Matsuyama due to reduced family circumstances. He later married the sister of Misao Fujimura. While still a student, he began writing literary criticism and was interested in the development of naturalism.

From 1920, Abe worked as a professor at Hosei University; however, he toured Europe extensively and spent some time at Heidelberg University in 1924 where he studied Kantian philosophy. In 1926 he accepted a position at Keijō Imperial University in Seoul Korea, where he became interested in Korean culture and Korean literature. He travelled to China in 1929, visiting Jinan, Qufu and climbed Mount Tai, and noted the strong Japanese commercial presence throughout Shandong Province. He also visited Manchuria and noted the increasing Chinese presence in Harbin 
Abe returned to mainland Japan in 1940, returning to his alma mater, the Daiichi High School in Tokyo. However, Abe soon ran afoul of the military authorities with his outspoken criticism of the military’s plans to cut short school curriculums to increase the numbers of conscripts, and of Prime Minister Fumimaro Konoe’s efforts to create a single-party state. Although occasionally harassed by the Kempeitai, he was not arrested.

After the end of World War II, Abe was appointed to a seat in the Upper House of the Diet of Japan in December 1945, and from January through March 1946 served as  Minister of Education in the cabinet of Prime Minister Kijūrō Shidehara, where he oversaw the post-war reform of the Japanese educational system. He helped draft the Fundamental Law of Education, and the current Tōyō kanji and Modern kana usage guidelines. As Education Minister, he also stated that he felt it was fortunate that Japan had been occupied by America instead of the Soviet Union. From October 1946, he was principal of the Gakushuin Peers’ School – a post he held until his death in 1966.

Abe was a strong supporter of the anti-war movement in the late 1950s and early 1960s, but maintained a critical stance against post-war socialism, which he viewed as dangerous as pre-war militarism.

Abe was awarded the Yomiuri Literary Prize in 1958 for his biography of Shigeo Iwanami. In 1964, he was awarded the Grand Cordon of the Order of the Sacred Treasure.
 
Abe died in Tokyo in 1966, but his grave is at the temple of Tōkei-ji in Kamakura.

References

External links

National Diet Library biography

Notes

1883 births
1966 deaths
People from Ehime Prefecture
University of Tokyo alumni
Government ministers of Japan
Members of the House of Peers (Japan)
Japanese educators
Japanese philosophers
Recipients of the Order of the Sacred Treasure, 1st class
Knights Commander of the Order of Merit of the Federal Republic of Germany
Academic staff of Hosei University
Heidelberg University alumni
Japanese expatriates in Germany
20th-century Japanese philosophers